Jimba Jimba Station, most often referred to as Jimba Jimba, is a pastoral lease currently operating as a cattle station in Western Australia, that once operated as a sheep station.

The property has double frontage to an approximately  length of the Gascoyne River, and backs onto the Kennedy Range in the Gascoyne region of Western Australia.

Description 
By 1885, the station had changed hands and was owned by Samuel James Phillips and his brother John H. Phillips.

Jimba Jimba was severely flooded along with surrounding properties including Erivilla and Clifton Downs in 1896 following heavy rains. The Gascoyne River and many of its tributaries broke their banks resulting in loss of stock.

By 1906 Messrs S. J. Phillips and Company owned Jimba Jimba and a total of 23,000 sheep were shorn producing 290 bales of wool.

Philip Ryan managed the station until 1907, when Douglas Philips, John Phillip's son, took over management of the property. In 1911 the property had a good shearing season with 400 bales of wool produced. Following the deaths of John and Samuel Philips the property passed onto Douglas in 1921. In 1926 approximately 19,000 sheep were shorn yielding 475 bales of wool.

A team of eight shearers led by Bill Young sheared 8,205 sheep in a 38½ hour week in 1954 at Jimba Jimba.

A seven-year drought was broken in 2010 when the area received its wettest day on record. Floodwaters almost surrounded the homestead, with people having to be winched from rooftops by a police helicopter.

Geology 

The station gave name to the Early Permian Jimba Jimba Formation, part of the Wooramel Group. In the limestones of the formation, many fossil bivalves, gastropods and brachiopods have been found. The crinoid Jimbacrinus bostocki, found in sandstones of the Cundlego Formation, was also named after the station.

See also 
 List of pastoral leases in Western Australia
 List of reduplicated Australian place names

References 

Homesteads in Western Australia
Pastoral leases in Western Australia
Shire of Upper Gascoyne
Paleontology in Australia
Heritage places of Western Australia
1878 establishments in Australia